Balut Beyg (also Romanized as Balūt Beyg and Balūţ Beyk; also known as Robāţ Beyk and Baluibak) is a village in Darreh Seydi Rural District, in the Central District of Borujerd County, Lorestan Province, Iran. At the 2006 census, its population was 138, in 33 families.

References 

Towns and villages in Borujerd County